Mothering is acting like a mother.

Mothering also may refer to:
 Mothering (magazine), American, on motherhood
 Mothering, customs associated with the holiday of Mothering Sunday
 Mothering (language) is a way of speaking adapted to infants and toddlers comprehension.

See also 
 The Mothering Heart (1913), film drama